The 2014–15 I-League U19 is the seventh season of the Indian I-League U19 competition. The season began on 13 December 2014 and concluded on 6 May 2015. AIFF Elite Academy won the trophy for the first time.

Teams

Group A – Kolkata

Table

Fixtures and Results

Group B – Goa

Table

Fixtures and Results

Group C – Maharashtra

Table

Fixtures and Results

Group D – Rest of India
Rest of India were divided in Zone A and Zone B and began their games on 1 February 2015.

Zone A

Table

Hindustan U19 qualified for the final round after the draws in their favour, as TATA FA U19 and Hindustan finished level on points, goal difference and goal scored.

Fixtures and Results

Zone B

Table

Fixtures and Results

Final round
Two teams each from Kolkata, Goa and Maharashtra zone will progress to the final round, while one team each from two Rest of India zones will go to the final round.

Source : I-League
Updated: 6 May 2015

Round 1

Round 2

Round 3

Round 4

Round 5

Round 6

Round 7

Top scorers

References

External links
 Official Website

2014–15 in Indian football
I-League U19 seasons